The 20th GLAAD Media Awards took place in 2009. They are given out by the Gay & Lesbian Alliance Against Defamation each year to recognize and honor the mainstream media for their fair, accurate and inclusive representations of the LGBT community and the issues that affect their lives. Events were held at the Marriott Marquis in New York City on March 28, at the Nokia Theatre in Los Angeles on April 18, and at the Hilton Towers in San Francisco on May 9, 2009.

New York City
Awards were handed out in the following categories:
Excellence in Media Award - Tyra Banks
Vito Russo Award - Suze Orman
Special Recognition - Phil Donahue
Special Recognition - "The Laramie Project, 10 Years Later: The Lasting Legacy of Matthew Shepard (The Derek and Romaine Show , Sirius XM Radio)
Outstanding Newspaper, Overall Coverage - The New York Times
Outstanding Documentary - A Jihad for Love
Outstanding Magazine, Overall Coverage - Newsweek
Outstanding Daily Drama - As the World Turns
Outstanding TV Journalism Segment - "Special Comment: Gay Marriage is a Question of Love", Countdown with Keith Olbermann
Outstanding Film, Limited Release - (tie) Noah's Arc: Jumping the Broom and Shelter
Outstanding Music Artist - k.d. lang, Watershed
Outstanding New York Theater, Broadway and Off-Broadway: Wig Out! by Tarell Alvin McCraney
Outstanding Spanish Language Magazine, Overall Coverage - People en Español
Outstanding Digital Journalism Article - "Gay Athletes Are Making Their Mark",  LZ Granderson (ESPN.com)
Outstanding Newspaper Columnist / Leonard Pitts Jr., The Miami Herald

Los Angeles
Vanguard Award - Kathy Griffin
Stephen F. Kolzak Award - Bishop Gene Robinson
Special Recognition - The L Word
Special Recognition - Prop 8: The Musical
Outstanding Film, Wide Release - Milk
Outstanding Comedy Series - Desperate Housewives
Outstanding Individual Episode, Comedy - "Unidentified Funk", The New Adventures of Old Christine
Outstanding L.A. Theatre - Secrets of the Trade by Jonathan Tolins
Outstanding Episode, Talk Show -  "Ellen & Portia's Wedding Day", The Ellen DeGeneres Show
Outstanding Spanish Language Journalism - "A juzgar por las apariencias" and "En otro cuerpo", Aquí y Ahora (Univision)
Outstanding Drama Series - Brothers & Sisters

San Francisco
Davidson/Valentini Award - Chad Allen
Special Recognition - Lucía Méndez
Special Recognition - Geoff Callan and Mike Shaw, Pursuit of Equality
Special Recognition - Dustin Lance Black
Outstanding Television Movie - East Side Story
Outstanding Reality Program - (tie) I Want to Work for Diddy (for including Laverne Cox) and Transamerican Love Story
Outstanding TV Journalism, Newsmagazine - "Funding the Marriage War", In the Life

See also
GLAAD Media Awards

References

20th
GLAAD
2009 in California
2009 in LGBT history
2009 in Los Angeles
2009 in New York City
2009 in San Francisco
Lists of LGBT-related award winners and nominees